may refer to:
Ōhashi Station, on the Nishitetsu Tenjin Ōmuta Line in Minami-ku, Fukuoka, Fukuoka Prefecture, Japan 
Ōhashi Station (Nagasaki), on the Nagasaki Electric Tramway Routes 1・2・3 in Nagasaki, Nagasaki Prefecture, Japan
Ōhashi Station (Ibaraki), on the discontinued Hitachi Electric Railway Line in Hitachi, Ibaraki Prefecture, Japan
Ōhashi Station (Kamaishi), on the discontinued Kamaishi Mining Railway in Kamaishi, Iwate Prefecture, Japan
Ōhashi Station (Tokyo), on the discontinued Tōkyū Tamagawa Line (tramway) in Setagaya, Tokyo, Japan

Other stations with similar names include: 
Rikuchū-Ōhashi Station (陸中大橋駅), on the JR East Kamaishi Line in Kamaishi, Iwate Prefecture, Japan
Ikejiri-Ōhashi Station (池尻大橋駅), on the Tōkyū Den-en-toshi Line that replaced Ōhashi Station (Tokyo) above